Július Ivan (born 25 March 1954) is a Slovak former track and field hurdler who competed in the 110 metres hurdles for Czechoslovakia. Born in Šurany, he was a member of the Dukla Banská Bystrica sports club and represented his country at the 1980 Moscow Olympics. He was a bronze medallist at the 1981 IAAF World Cup. He also represented his country at the European Athletics Championships twice and at the 1987 World Championships in Athletics. He was the B-final winner of the 1981 European Cup.

He was a five time national champion at the Czechoslovak Athletics Championships between 1975 and 1983, and also won two indoor national titles over 60 metres hurdles (1979 and 1980). His national title-winning time of 13.55 seconds outdoors in 1981 was a lifetime best, a championship record that was unbeaten for a decade, and ranked him second among Europeans for that season.

International competitions

National titles
Czechoslovak Athletics Championships
110 m hurdles: 1975, 1979, 1980, 1981, 1983
Czechoslovak Indoor Athletics Championships
60 m hurdles: 1979, 1980

See also
Czechoslovakia at the 1980 Summer Olympics

References

External links

Living people
1954 births
People from Šurany
Sportspeople from the Nitra Region
Czechoslovak male hurdlers
Slovak male hurdlers
World Athletics Championships athletes for Czechoslovakia
Athletes (track and field) at the 1980 Summer Olympics
Olympic athletes of Czechoslovakia